"Home" is a song written by Fred Lehner and Andy Spooner, and recorded by American country music singer Joe Diffie as his debut single. It was released in August 1990 as the lead-off single from his debut album A Thousand Winding Roads. "Home" rose to the top of all three major country format charts that were in existence at the time — Billboard, Radio & Records (now known as Mediabase 24/7), and the now-defunct Gavin Report — marking the first time in chart history that a country singer's debut single had done so. It also peaked at number 1 on the Canadian RPM Country Tracks chart.

Content
Diffie said the song stirred strong emotions. "I think everybody related to it, regardless of whether they were raised in the country or city, because everybody has a home in their memory."

Music video
A music video did not accompany the song, which was highly unusual for a hit record in the 1990s. Diffie told the Chicago Tribune that the decision happened by design. "We told people in radio that we wanted them to have the first shot at the music and I think they were appreciative of that."

Chart positions

Year-end charts

References

1990 debut singles
1990 songs
Joe Diffie songs
Song recordings produced by Bob Montgomery (songwriter)
Epic Records singles